Celada is a surname. Notable people with the surname include:

Adrian Celada, Filipino basketball player
Carlo Celada, Italian gymnast

See also
La Celada, a village in Córdoba, Spain
Celadas, a municipality in Teruel, Aragon, Spain
Celada, Gurabo, Puerto Rico, a barrio in the municipality of Gurabo in Puerto Rico